This article contains a list of the most studied restriction enzymes whose names start with Bd to Bp inclusive. It contains approximately 100 enzymes.

The following information is given:



Whole list navigation

Restriction enzymes

Bd - Bp

Notes

Biotechnology
Restriction enzyme cutting sites
Restriction enzymes